The Tongariro Power Scheme is a 360 MW hydroelectricity scheme in the central North Island of New Zealand. The scheme is currently operated by electricity generation company Genesis Energy.

The scheme takes water from tributaries of the Rangitikei, Whangaehu, Whanganui, and Tongariro rivers, which drain a  area covering Ruapehu, Ngauruhoe, Tongariro and the western Kaimanawa Ranges. The water is then sent through a large canal and tunnel system to generate electricity at three hydro power stations, located at Rangipo (120 MW), Tokaanu (240 MW) and Mangaio (2MW). The water is then drained into Lake Taupō where it is stored for further use in the succession of Waikato River power stations.

The scheme generates approximately 1350 GWh of electricity annually, and contributes 4 percent of New Zealand's electricity generation.

History
Plans to realise the potential of electricity generation in the central North Island volcanic plateau date back to the early years of the 20th century. A Californian engineer, L.M. Hancock, visited New Zealand in 1903 and, with engineer P.S. Hay, surveyed localities where power could be generated. In 1904 Hay's report to the government New Zealand Water-Powers identified a number of potential sites around the central plateau. These included Lake Rotoaira, the Whakapapa River and the Whangaehu River. A dam could be built on the Poutu River feeding into Lake Rotoaira and the amount of power generated could be increased by adding water from Tongariro or Ngauruhoe. While he identified the generation potential of the Wangaehu River Hay noted that it was polluted by volcanic acids and chemicals making it unsuitable. Between the 1920s and 1950s a number of investigations on the potential of the volcanic plateau were undertaken by engineers, mostly in the Public Works Department. In 1955 the British consulting engineering company Sir Alexander Gibb & Partners was contracted to conduct preliminary investigations; they produced a preliminary report in 1957. Gibb and Partners conducted further field studies and more detailed design, culminating in their report in 1962. The Gibb report recommended the construction of a power scheme in five stages:
 The Western Diversions – diversions of the Whanganui River and other streams on the western side of Mt Ruapehu into Lake Rotoaira
 The Tokaanu project – construction of the Tokaanu power station taking water from Lake Rotoaira
 The Moawhango project – diversion of streams on the south side of Mt Ruapehu and the Moawhango River into two dams at Moawhango, and construction of a tunnel from Moawhango to the Tongariro River
 The Rangipo project – diversion of water from the tributaries west of the Tongariro River to a dam on the river, and a power station at Rangipo
 The Tongariro project – construction of the Kaimanawa power station on the Tongariro River upstream of Begg's Pool 

The final project differed from Gibb's design: only one dam was built at Moawhango, the Kaimanawa station was not built, and an additional power station was built at Mangaio. The four stage project commenced in 1964 and was completed in 1983: the Western Diversion from 1964 to 1971, the Tokaanu project (Rotoaira Diversion) from 1966 to 1973, the Eastern Diversion from 1969 to 1979, and the Rangipo project (Tongariro Diversion) from 1974 to 1983.

Scheme

Eastern Diversion: Whangaehu River to Rangipo Dam
The Eastern Diversion starts at the Waiharakeke Stream, a tributary to the Whangaehu River, where the diversion starts. The aqueduct heads eastward, passing under the actual Whangaehu River, but not taking any water from it due to the fact it drains Mount Ruapehu's crater lake and is too acidic. At the end of the aqueduct, near the Desert Road (State Highway 1), water is then diverted through the  Mangaio Tunnel under the State Highway and either into Mangaio Power Station or a drop structure to enter Lake Moawhango via the Mangaio Stream.

Lake Moawhango is an artificial lake made by the damming of the Moawhango River and Mangaio Stream, two tributaries to the Rangitikei River. Water from Lake Moawhango is then diverted into the  Moawhango Tunnel to the Rangipo Dam.

The Rangipo Dam is built on the Tongariro River, with water coming from the eastern slopes of Ruapehu and the western slopes of the Kaimanawa Ranges joining the scheme at the dam. Water from the nearby Waihohonu Stream is also taken and diverted via the  Waihohonu Tunnel to Rangipo Dam.

Tongariro Diversion: Rangipo Dam to Lake Rotoaira
The lake behind the Rangipo Dam acts as a head pond to the Rangipo Power Station. After passing through Rangipo Power Station, the water passes through the  Rangipo Tailrace Tunnel to the Poutu Dam on the Tongariro River.

After taking on more water from the Tongariro River (which now includes water from the eastern slopes of Ngauruhoe and Tongariro), the water is diverted through the Poutu Canal, where the water travels under State Highway 1 and State Highway 46 to the Poutu Stream. Joining with the Poutu Stream, the water enters Lake Rotoaira, where it merges with water from the Western Diversion.

Western Diversion: Whakapapa River to Lake Rotoaira

Water from the Whanganui River is diverted via a short tunnel into the Te Whaiau Stream, which joins water from the Whakapapa and other intakes. Water from Lake Te Whaiau is then diverted into the Otamangakau Canal into Lake Otamangakau, where the water is joined by water from the Otamangakau Stream.

From Lake Otamangakau, water from the Western Diversion is diverted into the Wairehu Canal, where it travels under State Highway 47 and into Lake Rotoaira, joining water from the Eastern Diversion.

Rotoaira Diversion: Lake Rotoaira to Lake Taupō
Lake Rotoaira stores water from both the Eastern and Western Diversions, and also stores water coming off Mount Pihanga and Mount Tihia. The lake also acts as the head pond to the Tokaanu Power Station.

Water is taken from the northern end of Lake Rotoaira into the  Tokaanu Tunnel, which takes the water down under State Highway 47 and through Mount Tihia to the Tokaanu Power Station. After passing through the station, the water is deposited into the  Tokaanu Tailrace Canal.

The canal passes under the unique Tokaanu Tailrace Bridge, a combined road bridge and aqueduct. State Highway 41 travels over the top of the bridge, with the Tokaanu Stream, an important trout spawning stream, running under the road surface. The canal then drains into Lake Taupō at Waihi Bay.

Power stations

Three power stations exist on the scheme, Rangipo, Tokaanu and Mangaio. The power stations are controlled by a control room at Tokaanu.

Rangipo
Rangipo Power Station is located on the Eastern Diversion of the scheme. The power station is built  underground to minimise visual impact, the second hydro station in New Zealand to do so (after Manapōuri Power Station). The station was commissioned in 1983.

Rangipo Power Station connects to the single-circuit 220 kV Bunnythorpe to Wairakei line (BPE-WRK-A) via a short 220 kV twin-circuit deviation line (RPO-DEV-A).

Tokaanu
Tokaanu Power Station is located on the Rotoaira Diversion of the scheme. The station was commissioned in 1973. Tokaanu also houses the control room for the entire Tongariro Power Scheme.

Tokaanu Power Station connects to the two single-circuit 220 kV Bunnythorpe to Whakamaru lines (BPE-WKM-A and BPE-WKM-B) directly south of the station.

Mangaio

See also

List of power stations in New Zealand
Tongariro National Park
Waikato River

References

Further reading

External links 
Tongariro Power Scheme - Genesis Energy
Tongariro Power Scheme Map and Cross-section
Tongariro Power Scheme Annual Environmental Report 2013
Tongariro Power (1970) Video about the construction of the scheme.

Buildings and structures in Waikato
Buildings and structures in Manawatū-Whanganui
Buildings and structures in the Taupo District